Ghezaal Enayat (born 1996) is an Afghan singer and songwriter. She rose to fame with her first duet song "Dil-e Beqarar". She sings both in Dari and Pashto languages. She was born in Kabul, and her parents are from Laghman.

Career 
In 2009, she began her career as a simple singer in Afghanistan and in 2011, when she migrated to Canada, she began her professional music career as a singer. At first, she never showed her face in music videos, afterwards having more courage, she showed herself in her music videos. She became famous with her first duet song in "Ashti" album with Afghan singer, Nazir Khara. "Dil-e-Biqarar" song was the first hit song of her. She continued singing with Nazir and several famous songs are "Wayrana Manzil", "Jigarom Jigarom", "Dak Dak", "Ma Ba Qurban Tu" and "Dobara Baran Meshowad".

Ghezaal is the first Afghan Singer to enter into Bollywood the projects with Bollywood are still Pending.

In 2012, Ghezaal was chosen as the best new female singer at the Aryana Television Awards. In 2013, her "Ashiqi" song which is a trio song with two other leading male singers of Afghanistan, became the best song of the year at the Aryana television awards. In 2017, she represented Afghanistan in the global village festival in front of more than 21,000 people. Later that year, she got the title of the best singer of the year from BBC Persian.
She has performed many concerts in Canada, United States, Tajikistan and in Europe.

Awards

References
 The content of this article is based on its Persian equivalent on Persian Wikipedia.

1989 births
Living people
Afghan women singers
Pashto-language singers
Persian-language singers
People from Laghman Province
Afghan expatriates in Canada
21st-century Afghan women singers